Strother is an unincorporated community in Monroe County, in the U.S. state of Missouri.

History
A post office called Strother was established in 1884, and remained in operation until 1938. The community has the name of French Strother, a local educator.

References

Unincorporated communities in Monroe County, Missouri
Unincorporated communities in Missouri